Coen Hess (born 14 August 1996) is an Australian professional rugby league footballer who plays as a  forward for the North Queensland Cowboys in the NRL.

He has played at representative level for Queensland in the State of Origin series.

Background
Hess was born in Bundaberg, Queensland, Australia and lived in the town until the age of 8.

While in Bundaberg, he played junior rugby league for the Across The Waves Tigers club and attended St Patrick's Catholic School. He then moved with his family to Mount Isa, where he played for the Mount Isa Black Stars. In 2012, Hess signed a scholarship deal with the North Queensland Cowboys and moved to Townsville where he attended Ignatius Park College.

Playing career
In 2012, Hess represented the Queensland under-16 side. In 2014, Hess made his NYC debut for the Cowboys, scoring a try in his side's loss to the Newcastle Knights. Later that year he represented the Queensland under-18 side and was a member of the Townsville Stingers' victorious Mal Meninga Cup and National Under-18 Championship sides.

2015
In January 2015, Hess was a member of Queensland's Emerging Maroons squad and played for the Cowboys in the 2015 NRL Auckland Nines tournament. On 19 March 2015, Hess re-signed with the Cowboys for a further three seasons. On 2 May 2015, Hess represented the Junior Kangaroos against Junior Kiwis, starting at second-row in the 22-20 win at Robina Stadium. On 8 July 2015, Hess would represent for Queensland Under 20s against New South Wales Under 20s, starting at second-row in the 32-16 loss at Suncorp Stadium. In June 2015, Hess made his Queensland Cup debut for the Mackay Cutters, scoring two tries and setting up another in their 28-18 victory over the Redcliffe Dolphins in which Hess was given man of the match honours. In Round 24 of the 2015 NRL season, Hess made his first-grade debut for the North Queensland Cowboys, playing off the interchange bench, scoring a try on debut in North Queensland's impressive 50-16 win at Mt Smart Stadium. This was Hess's only NRL match in the season. On 14 September 2015, Hess was named at second-row in the 2015 NYC Team of the Year.

2016
On 6 January, Hess was selected in the QAS under-20s Origin squad. In February 2016, Hess was selected in North Queensland's  2016 NRL Auckland Nines squad. In Round 12 against the St George Illawarra Dragons, Hess made his first appearance in North Queensland's first grade team for 2016, playing off the interchange bench in the 14-10 loss at WIN Stadium. In North Queensland's sudden-death Semi Finals match against Queensland rivals the Brisbane Broncos, Hess started at second-row for the injured Ethan Lowe, playing the whole 90 minutes, scoring a try and ran 188 metres as North Queensland won 26-20 in extra time at 1300SMILES Stadium. Hess would start again at second-row for North Queensland's Preliminary Final match against the Cronulla-Sutherland Sharks, scoring a try in the 32-20 loss at Sydney Football Stadium. Hess finished the 2016 NRL season with him playing in 8 matches and scoring 4 tries for North Queensland.

2017
In January 2017, Hess was selected in the QAS Emerging Origin squad. In February 2017, Hess was selected in the Cowboys 2017 NRL Auckland Nines squad. After showing impressive form for North Queensland, scoring 10 tries in 13 matches, Hess was in contention to make into the Queensland State of Origin squad. After Queensland were beaten convincingly by New South Wales 28-4 in Game 1, the Maroons squad had a major cleanout and Hess was selected to make his representative debut for Queensland in Game 2 of the 2017 State of Origin series, playing off the interchange bench in the Maroons 18-16 win at ANZ Stadium. Hess would also play in Game 3 off the interchange bench in the Maroons series 22-6 win at Suncorp Stadium. On 1 October 2017, in North Queensland's 2017 NRL Grand Final against the Melbourne Storm Hess played off the interchange bench in the 34-6 defeat at ANZ Stadium. Hess finished his impressive 2017 NRL season with him being the North Queensland club's second highest tryscorer with 13 tries in 27 matches.

2018
Hess became a regular starter at second row for the North Queensland outfit in the 2018 NRL season. Of his 23 games for the side, he started in 19 of them. He was once again selected for Queensland, playing all three games off the interchange in the 2018 State of Origin series.

On 14 December 2018, Hess signed a three-year extension with the North Queensland club until the end of the 2022 season.

2019
Hess played 22 games for the North Queensland club, starting eight games at second row and four at centre. In a disappointing season, Hess lost his starting second row position for North Queensland and his spot in the Queensland side. He scored just one try, his lowest try tally since his debut season in 2015.

2020
In February, Hess was a member of the North Queensland club's 2020 NRL Nines winning squad, scoring three tries in the tournament. Following a Round 16 loss to the Cronulla-Sutherland Sharks, Hess was charged with a crusher tackle and was suspended for one game.

2021
In June, Hess was 18th man for the Queensland State of Origin squads for both Games I and II. In Game III, he was rushed into the side as 19th man. At seasons end, he was named North Queensland's Paul Bowman medalist for club player of the year.

2022
In round 24 of the 2022 NRL season, Hess was sent to the sin bin during North Queensland's 20-10 loss against South Sydney.
Hess played a total of 23 games for North Queensland in 2022 as the club reached the preliminary final before losing to Parramatta 24-20.

Achievements and accolades

Individual
North Queensland Cowboys Rookie of the Year: 2015
NYC Team of the Year: 2015
North Queensland Cowboys Player of the Year: 2021

Team
2020 NRL Nines: North Queensland Cowboys – Winners

Statistics

NRL
 Statistics are correct to the end of the 2020 season

State of Origin

References

External links
North Queensland Cowboys profile
NRL profile

1996 births
Living people
Australian rugby league players
Mackay Cutters players
North Queensland Cowboys players
Northern Pride RLFC players
Queensland Rugby League State of Origin players
Rugby league players from Bundaberg
Rugby league second-rows